Buena High School is a high school in Sierra Vista, Arizona. It is the only high school in the Sierra Vista Unified School District.

The current school building was built in the early 1990s to accommodate an ever-expanding student enrollment and opened in the spring of the 1991–92 school year. The school was built to handle an enrollment of up to 2,500 students; it was over-capacity from its opening and filled to capacity through the late 2000s.

It serves high school-aged dependent children living on Fort Huachuca.

Theater 
Buena was built with a large theater for use by both the high school and the community.  The Klein Performing Arts Center  main auditorium can seat from 907 to as many as 1319 by opening the two 'pods'. The Little Theater Pod seats 206 and features a small stage with self-contained computer lighting and sound. The Lecture Pod seats 213 and is ideal for group meetings. Several school, community, and commercial events are held in the various BPAC facilities each year.
Buena's performing arts program was also ranked among the top in the nation, led by beloved fine arts teacher, Carrie Duerk.

Clubs and organizations 
Buena High School has over 60 student clubs and organizations. A list can be found on the "Clubs and Organizations" portion of the school's website.

Notable alumni

 Don Frye, wrestler; retired professional mixed martial artist
 Laurence Gibson (2009), National Football League player
 Stan Short (1991) National Football League player
 Lisa Song Sutton (2002), entrepreneur, Miss Nevada United States 2014 and former congressional candidate
 John Rade (1978), National Football League player
 Rick Renzi (1976), former Republican Congressman, and convicted criminal 
 Donnie Veal (2003), Major League Baseball player
 Darick Hall (2014) Major League Baseball player
 Kimberly (Zeiler) Lattimore (1984), Ms. California America 2013
 Luis Robles (2002), Major League Soccer player (New York Red Bulls)
Fernando Ortega (2002) Major League Baseball Scout
Brandi Milloy (2001), TV Host, Food Reporter, Lifestyle & Parenting Expert 
 Audrey Valles née Sibley (2003), Miss Arizona 2005
 Erin Nurss (2003), Miss Arizona 2008
 Victor Jay Ratliff (1994), National Football League player

See also 
Cochise County, Arizona

References

External links
Buena High School
Buena Performing Arts Center (BPAC)
Sierra Vista Unified District No. 68

Public high schools in Arizona
Schools in Cochise County, Arizona
Sierra Vista, Arizona